Golden Skillet is a fast-food chain that mainly sells fried chicken originating in Richmond, Virginia. The first Golden Skillet chicken was sold in 1963 at the downtown Richmond department store Thalhimer's. The fried chicken recipe was created by Clifton W. Guthrie, the original owner and founder of Golden Skillet.  

The slogan for the chain was "Tender as Quail! Tasty as Pheasant!" While the recipe was not officially published, it is known that the fried chicken was cooked in special pressure-cookers and with specific breading.

History 
In 1963, a vice president of a Thalhimers grocery store tasted Guthrie's chicken at a banquet and shortly after, it was sold at the Thalhimers' restaurant. 

Eventually, in Richmond, the first freestanding location opened in 1968. By October 2, 1981, Guthrie's death, the chain had grown to 180 franchises worldwide and 16 places of operation. It had affiliate firms with Puerto Rico, Canada, and Japan. As of 2022, the chain is in decline as multiple locations have been closed permanently.

Golden Skillet would be sold to American chain Dairy Queen sometime in the 1980s after Guthrie's death.

Locations 
Some locations of the franchise include Sandston, Virginia, Plymouth, North Carolina, Henderson, North Carolina, Ahoskie, North Carolina, Petersburg, Virginia, and Richmond, Virginia.

See also
 List of fast-food chicken restaurants

References 

Restaurants in Virginia
Restaurants established in 1968
Fast-food poultry restaurants
1968 establishments in Virginia